Makoua Airport  is an airport serving the town of Makoua in the Cuvette Department, Republic of the Congo.

The Makoua VOR (Ident:CF) is located on the field.

See also

 List of airports in the Republic of the Congo
 Transport in the Republic of the Congo

References

External links
OurAirports - Makoua
OpenStreetMap - Makoua

Airports in the Republic of the Congo